Yombiro  is a town and sub-prefecture in the Kissidougou Prefecture in the Faranah Region of Guinea. As of 2014 it had a population of 14,340 people.

References

Sub-prefectures of the Faranah Region